Aliya Karimova (born 31 January 1978) is a Kazakhstani synchronized swimmer. She competed in the women's duet at the 2000 and 2004 Olympic Games.

References 

1978 births
Living people
Kazakhstani synchronized swimmers
Olympic synchronized swimmers of Kazakhstan
Synchronized swimmers at the 2000 Summer Olympics
Synchronized swimmers at the 2004 Summer Olympics
Artistic swimmers at the 1998 Asian Games
Artistic swimmers at the 2002 Asian Games
Asian Games competitors for Kazakhstan
21st-century Kazakhstani women